I figli non si vendono (literally, Children must not be sold) is a 1952 Italian melodrama film by Mario Bonnard.

Plot

Cast
 Lea Padovani as Anna
 Jacques Sernas as Carlo Dazzeni / Roberto Dazzeni
 Maria Grazia Francia as Luisa
 Paola Barbara as Signora Elena Dazzeni
 Antonella Lualdi as Daniela
 Dario Michaelis as Gianni
 Checco Durante as Paolo Dazzeni
 Galeazzo Benti
 Dina Sassoli
 Dina Perbellini

References

External links
 

1952 films
1950s Italian-language films
Films directed by Mario Bonnard
Italian drama films
Italian black-and-white films
1952 drama films
Melodrama films
1950s Italian films